Pilot Bay Provincial Park is a provincial park in British Columbia, Canada.

The park is located on Kootenay Lake. The bay at the park is good for swimming and fishing. In the park there are many hiking tracks around and the Pilot Bay Lighthouse is nearby. The park is accessible by road. The area is 374 hectares. Drinking water is not available inside the park.

References

External links

Provincial parks of British Columbia
Regional District of Central Kootenay
1964 establishments in British Columbia
Protected areas established in 1964